Denis Daudi Afande (1937-2021) was a long-serving career Kenyan diplomat who held eight ambassadorial positions during his career. A consummate Diplomat, Afande joined the public service at Kenya's Independence (1964). He served as Kenya’s Deputy Chief of Protocol under founding President Jomo Kenyatta and chief of protocol under President Danial arap Moi. He later served as Kenya’s ambassador to Washington (1988-1994), the United Nations Mission in Geneva, Switzerland, the UK, Germany, France, Egypt and Saudi Arabia.

Afande retired in 1995 as Permanent Secretary in the Ministry of Health after having also served as Permanent Secretary in the Ministry of Home Affairs. In retirement, Amb Afande served on the Boards of several state and private sector institutions including Capital Markets Authority, Kenya Power, Kenya Airways, Standard Chartered Bank and Undugu Society and Nyumbani Children’s Home among others.

Afande was also a member of the Standing Committee on Human Rights, and the National Council of Children’s Services.

He was also Kenya's ambassador to Washington in February, 1990, at the time former Foreign Affairs Minister Dr Robert Ouko was murdered near his farmhouse in Koru, Western Kenya, two weeks after President Daniel Moi and a delegation of 83 ministers and civil servants, including the late Dr Robert Ouko, visited Washington D.C. for a ‘Prayer Breakfast’ hosted by President George H. W. Bush.

The Washington Trip

Afande was also Kenya's ambassador to Washington in February, 1990, at the time former Foreign Affairs Minister Dr Robert Ouko was murdered and hosted the delegation of Kenya's Ministers led by retired president Daniel Moi. This trip became a crucial story and formed part of the investigations and theories surrounding the murder of Robert Ouko, who was murdered two weeks after the trip.

Death 
Denis Afande died on Sunday, June 6, 2021 at 11pm at Avenue Hospital in Kisumu. He was aged 84. A month previously he had been hit by a motorbike near his home in Busia as he walked to his local Catholic Church. He was survived by five children and many grandchildren.

President Uhuru Kenyatta mourned the late Afande as consummate diplomat and pioneer public servant whose long and distinguished service helped lay the foundation of the Kenyan Nation.

In his message,  Kenyatta said Ambassador Afande helped "position Kenya on the global map as a steadfast Republic".

References 

1937 births
2021 deaths
Diplomats
Ambassadors
Ambassadors of Kenya to the United States